Admiral Sir Robert Harland, 1st Baronet (ca. 1715 – 21 February 1784) was a Royal Navy officer. He commanded HMS Tilbury at the Second Battle of Cape Finisterre in October 1747 during the War of the Austrian Succession and commanded HMS Princess Louisa at the Battle of Lagos in August 1759 during the Seven Years' War. He went on to be Commander-in-Chief of the East Indies Station and then First Naval Lord.

Naval career

Born the son of Captain Robert Harland, Harland joined the Royal Navy in 1729 when he was appointed a Volunteer-per-order on HMS Falkland. He was present as a lieutenant on HMS Princessa at the Battle of Toulon on 11 February 1744. He was given command of the fireship HMS Scipio in 1745 and, with promotion to post captain on 19 March 1746, he took command of HMS Tilbury and took part in Second Battle of Cape Finisterre on 14 October 1747. He was then appointed to HMS Nottingham later that year and the following year had a major role in the capture of the French 74 gun Magnanime on 31 January 1748. He commanded HMS Monarch from 1748 and HMS Essex from 1755 before transferring to HMS Conqueror in 1758. In 1759 he transferred to HMS Princess Louisa and took part in the Battle of Lagos on 18 August 1759.

Harland was promoted to rear-admiral on 18 October 1770 and appointed Commander-in-Chief of the East Indies Station in 1771 remaining there until 1775. He was appointed a baronet on 19 March 1771. He was further promoted to vice-admiral on 5 February 1776 before becoming second in command of the Channel Fleet and fighting at the Battle of Ushant on 27 July 1778.

Harland was appointed to the Board of Admiralty in the Second Rockingham ministry in April 1782. He served as First Naval Lord from 1 April 1782, with the rank of full admiral from 8 April 1782, until he left on 30 January 1783. He died at his home in Sproughton in Suffolk on 21 February 1784.

Family
In 1749 he married Susanna Reynold; they had three daughters and a son.

References

Sources

 

|-

|-

1715 births
1784 deaths
Baronets in the Baronetage of Great Britain
Royal Navy admirals
Lords of the Admiralty
Royal Navy personnel of the War of the Austrian Succession
Royal Navy personnel of the Seven Years' War
Royal Navy personnel of the American Revolutionary War